Downtown Toledo is the central business district of Toledo, Ohio. Both the Warehouse District and the area surrounding the Huntington Center have been areas of recent growth.

Major attractions 

Fifth Third Field
Hensville
Warehouse District
Huntington Center
Imagination Station
Promenade Park
SeaGate Convention Centre
Toledo Farmers' Market
Valentine Theatre

Tallest buildings 

One SeaGate: 411 ft, built in 1982
Fiberglas Tower: 405 ft, built in 1970
PNC Bank Building: 368 ft, built in 1932
Michael DiSalle Government Center: 328 ft, built in 1982

Other notable architecture 

Anthony Wayne Bridge
Berdan Building
Commodore Perry Apartments
Edison Plaza
Gardner Building
Lucas County Courthouse
Main Branch of the Toledo-Lucas County Public Library
Martin Luther King Bridge
Nasby Building
Nicholas Building
Ohio Building
Oliver House
Owens Corning World Headquarters
Pythian Castle
Riverfront Apartments
Secor Building
Standart Lofts
St. Patrick's Catholic Church
St. Paul's Lutheran Church
Spitzer Building
Trinity Episcopal Church
U.S. Northern District of Ohio Courthouse
Veterans' Glass City Skyway

Gallery

References 

Neighborhoods in Toledo, Ohio
Toledo